In the world of model aircraft there are several competition classes to signify engine displacement.

Model engines